Wang Tao (born 1980), better known as Frank Wang, is a  Chinese aerospace engineer and businessman. He is the founder and CEO of the Shenzhen-based technology company DJI, the world's largest manufacturer of commercial drones. As of December 2020, he has a net worth of US$4.8 billion.

Biography
Wang was born in Hangzhou, Zhejiang province. He showed an interest in flight and airborne devices from a young age, but received mediocre grades as a schoolchild. He attended the Hong Kong University of Science & Technology (HKUST) for college, and drew the attention of math professor Li Zexiang following an impressive performance on a class project to build a helicopter flight control system. Li subsequently brought Wang into the school's graduate program. In 2005, Wang participated in ABU Robocon and his HKUST team won third prize among teams competing from across Asia.  HKUST granted him HK$18,000 (US$2,300) to conduct research and develop a drone.

Wang built the first prototypes of DJI's projects in his dorm room, selling the flight control components to universities and Chinese electric companies. He used the proceeds to move to the industrial hub of Shenzhen and hired a small staff in 2006. The company struggled at first, with a high degree of churn among employees that has been attributed to Wang's abrasive personality and perfectionist expectations of his employees. The company sold a modest amount of components during this period, relying as well on financial support from Wang's family friend, Lu Di, who provided US$90,000 and managed the company's finances.

In 2010, Wang hired a high school friend, Swift Xie Jia, to run the company's marketing. DJI began to cater more to drone hobbyists in markets outside of China. In 2011, Wang met the former television game-show contestant Colin Guinn at a trade show, and the two of them would found DJI North America, a subsidiary company focusing on mass market drone sales. In 2013, DJI released the first model of the Phantom drone, an entry-level drone which was significantly more user-friendly than any other drone on the market at the time. The Phantom was a worldwide commercial success, but this success led to conflict between Guinn and Wang. Midway through the year, Wang made an offer to buy Guinn out, which Guinn refused. By the end of the year, DJI had locked all employees of the North American subsidiary out of their email accounts and was well on its way to shutting down the subsidiary's operations. Guinn sued DJI, and the case was settled out of court.

In 2015, DJI eclipsed the success of the Phantom with the release of the Phantom 3, whose even greater popularity was in part due to the addition of a built in live-streaming camera. DJI became the largest consumer drone company in the world, driving many of its competitors out of the market over the following years. In 2017, Wang became Asia's youngest tech billionaire. By 2020, DJI held nearly 77% of the US market share for consumer drones, with no other company holding more than 4%.

References

1980 births
Living people
21st-century Chinese businesspeople
Alumni of the Hong Kong University of Science and Technology
Billionaires from Zhejiang
Businesspeople from Hangzhou
Chinese computer businesspeople
Chinese company founders
DJI
East China Normal University alumni